Wilby is a town located in the Shire of Moira Local Government Area, Victoria. The post office opened on 10 July 1883 and was closed on 30 June 1978.

References

External links

Towns in Victoria (Australia)
Shire of Moira